Abbasid Civil War may refer to:

 the Fourth Fitna, specifically the conflict between al-Amin and al-Ma'mun in 811–813
 the Abbasid civil war (865–866) during the Anarchy at Samarra